Argyresthia submontana is a moth of the family Yponomeutidae. It is found in Sweden, Finland, Germany, Poland, Slovakia, Austria, Switzerland, Italy and France.

The wingspan is 11–13 mm. Adults are on wing from June to August.

The larvae feed on Sorbus aria and possibly also cultivated Cotoneaster species.

References

Moths described in 1871
Argyresthia
Moths of Europe